The Nipmuc River is a river in the U.S. state of Rhode Island. It flows . There are no dams along the river's length. The river is named for the indigenous Nipmuc peoples.

Course
The river is formed in Burrillville by the confluence of Round Top Brook and the Chockalog River. It flows south to the village of Pascoag where it flows into the Clear River. A USGS stream gauge number 01111300 is located on the river.

Crossings
There are no crossings over the Nipmuc River due to its short length.

Tributaries
The Nipmuc River has no named tributaries, though it has many unnamed streams that also feed it.

See also
List of rivers in Rhode Island

References

Maps from the United States Geological Survey

Rivers of Providence County, Rhode Island
Burrillville, Rhode Island
Rivers of Rhode Island
Tributaries of Providence River